The will of God or divine will is a concept found in the Hebrew Bible, the New Testament, and the Quran, according to which God's will is the first cause of everything that exists.

See also
 Destiny
 Deus vult, a Latin expression meaning "God wills it", canonically expressed at the outset of the First Crusade.
 Divine law, any law that, according to religious belief, comes directly from the will of God, in contrast to man-made law.
 "God willing" is an English  expression often used to indicate that the speaker hopes that his or her actions are those that are willed by God, or that it is in accordance with God's will that some desired event will come to pass, or that some negative event will not come to pass.
  God's Plan (disambiguation)
 Inshallah
 Karma
 Luisa Piccarreta
 Mashallah
 Plan of salvation, in general Christian concept.
 Plan of salvation (Latter Day Saints) is the view of God's plan as described by the Latter Day Saint movement.
 Predestination
 Predestination in Islam
 Providentialism is the belief that all events on Earth are controlled by God.
 Will (philosophy)

References 

Theology